De Udstillede (English: The Exhibited) is a 2000 Danish documentary film directed by Jesper Jargil. It documents a theatrical experiment devised by Lars von Trier.

The mechanism 
Lars von Trier's experiment, conducted in 1996, was called Psychomobile 1 – The World Clock. Von Trier set up a video camera in the desert near Los Alamos, New Mexico, pointed at a piece of ground. The images recorded by this camera were fed into a digital apparatus.

At the same time, the Art Society Building in Copenhagen had been converted into a theatrical space consisting of 19 rooms. These rooms formed the stage to be used for three hours per day for 50 days by a group of 53 actors. Each room had a viewing space for the audience, who could wander from room to room to see the interactions of the actors. The actors were not given a script, but rather an explanation of their characters, each of which had four different sets of traits. The actors were instructed to improvise based on these four character phases.

Each room had a siren and a set of four coloured lights, and each phase of each character was linked to one of the four lights. Whatever light was illuminated in a particular room meant that any actors in that room had to act according to the character traits which corresponded to that light. When the siren in a particular room sounded, this signaled a change in which light was illuminated, and the actors had to adjust their performance accordingly.

The change of light was triggered by a certain number of ants crossing a certain part of the image being recorded in New Mexico. The frequency with which the changes occurred was thus determined by whether very few or a great many ants happened to be crossing the area of desert watched by the video camera.

The result 
Jargil's film largely follows the problems and emotions faced by the actors in this unusual situation. It documents the way in which problems between the actors in real life affected their performance, and vice versa. Von Trier appears at the beginning of the film, organising the project and giving the actors direction, however he was away from Copenhagen during most of the actual theatrical event.

External links

Review of De Udstillede
Review of De Udstillede
Entry on von Trier at filmreference.com, containing information on De Udstillede

Danish avant-garde and experimental films
2000 films
2000s Danish-language films
Danish documentary films
Documentary films about films
2000 documentary films
Lars von Trier
2000s avant-garde and experimental films